Miss Caraïbes Hibiscus is an annual international beauty contest for all countries of the Caribbean and the Americas. It was founded in 1990 in the French part of Saint Martin.

TitleHolders

Ranking

External links
 Official Website
 Curacao won the 2009 competition
 Miss Caraibes Hibiscus Curacao

Beauty pageants in the Collectivity of Saint Martin